Tischeria decidua is a moth of the  family Tischeriidae. It is found in Central and Southern Europe, but has recently expanded its range and has been spotted in the Netherlands and Poland.

The larvae feed on Castanea sativa and Quercus species, including Quercus cerris, Quercus faginea, Quercus macrolepis, Quercus pedunculiflora, Quercus petraea, Quercus pubescens and Quercus robur x turneri. They mine the leaves of their host plant.

External links
bladmineerders.nl 

Tischeriidae
Moths of Japan
Moths of Europe
Moths described in 1876